An absurdity is a state or condition of being extremely unreasonable, meaningless or unsound in reason so as to be irrational or not taken seriously. "Absurd" is an adjective used to describe an absurdity, e.g., "Tyler and the boys laughed at the absurd situation." It derives from the Latin absurdum meaning "out of tune", hence irrational. The Latin surdus means "deaf", implying stupidity.
Absurdity is contrasted with being realistic or reasonable In general usage, absurdity may be synonymous with fanciful, foolish, bizarre, wild or nonsense. In specialized usage, absurdity is related to extremes in bad reasoning or pointlessness in reasoning; ridiculousness is related to extremes of incongruous juxtaposition, laughter, and ridicule; and nonsense is related to a lack of meaningfulness. Absurdism is a concept in philosophy related to the notion of absurdity.

History 
Absurdity has been used throughout history regarding foolishness and extremely poor reasoning to form belief.

Ancient Greece

In Aristophanes' 5th century BC comedy The Wasps, his protagonist Philocleon learned the "absurdities" of Aesop's Fables, considered to be unreasonable fantasy, and not real.

Plato often used "absurdity" to describe very poor reasoning, or the conclusion from adopting a position that is false and thus reaching a false conclusion, called an "absurdity" (argument by reductio ad absurdum). Plato describes himself as not using absurd argumentation against himself in Parmenides. In Gorgias, Plato refers to an "inevitable absurdity" as the outcome of reasoning from a false assumption.

Aristotle rectified an irrational absurdity in reasoning with empiricism using likelihood, "once the irrational has been introduced and an air of likelihood imparted to it, we must accept it in spite of the absurdity. He claimed that absurdity in reasoning being veiled by charming language in poetry, "As it is, the absurdity is veiled by the poetic charm with which the poet invests it... But in the Epic poem the absurdity passes unnoticed."

Renaissance and early modern periods

Michel de Montaigne, father of the essay and modern skepticism, argued that the process of abridgement is foolish and produces absurdity, "Every abridgement of a good book is a foolish abridgement... absurdity [is] not to be cured... satisfied with itself than any reason, can reasonably be."

Francis Bacon, an early promoter of empiricism and the scientific method, argued that absurdity is a necessary component of scientific progress, and should not always be laughed at. He continued that bold new ways of thinking and bold hypotheses often led to absurdity, "For if absurdity be the subject of laughter, doubt you but great boldness is seldom without some absurdity."

Approaches to absurdity

Rhetoric
Absurdity arises when one's own speech deviates from common sense, is too poetic, or when one is unable to defend oneself with speech and reason. In Aristotle's book Rhetoric, Aristotle discusses the situations in which absurdity is employed and how it affects one's use of persuasion. According to Aristotle, the idea of a man being unable to persuade someone by his words is absurd. Any unnecessary information to the case is unreasonable and makes the speech unclear. If the speech becomes too unclear; the justification for their case becomes unpersuasive, making the argument absurd.

Philosophy 

Absurdity is used in existentialist and related philosophy to describe absurdly pointless efforts to try to find such meaning or purpose in an objective and uncaring world, a philosophy known as absurdism. It is illogical to seek purpose or meaning in an uncaring world without purpose or meaning, or to accumulate excessive wealth in the face of certain death. 

In his paper, The Absurd, Thomas Nagel analyzed the perpetual absurdity of human life. Absurdity in life becomes apparent when we realize the fact that we take our lives seriously, while simultaneously perceiving that there is a certain arbitrarity in everything we do.  He suggests never to stop searching for the absurd.  Furthermore, he suggests searching for irony amongst the absurdity.

Philosophy of language

G. E. Moore, an English analytic philosopher, cited as a paradox of language such superficially absurd statements as, "I went to the pictures last Tuesday but I don't believe it". They can be true and logically consistent, and are not contradictory on further consideration of the user's linguistic intent. Wittgenstein observes that in some unusual circumstances absurdity itself disappears in such statements, as there are cases where "It is raining but I don't believe it" can make sense, i.e., what appears to be an absurdity is not nonsense.

Demarcation with sound reasoning

Medical commentators have criticized  methods and reasoning in alternative and complementary medicine and integrative medicine as being either absurdities or being between evidence and absurdity. They state it often misleads the public with euphemistic terminology, such as the expressions "alternative medicine" and "complementary medicine", and call for a clear demarcation between valid scientific evidence and scientific methodology and absurdity.

Absurdity in literature 
Hobbes' Table of Absurdity 

Thomas Hobbes distinguished absurdity from errors, including basic linguistic errors as when a word is simply used to refer to something which does not have that name. According to Aloysius Martinich: "What Hobbes is worried about is absurdity. Only human beings can embrace an absurdity, because only human beings have language, and philosophers are more susceptible to it than others". Hobbes wrote that "words whereby we conceive nothing but the sound, are those we call absurd, insignificant, and nonsense. And therefore if a man should talk to me of a round quadrangle; or, accidents of bread in cheese; or, immaterial substances; or of a free subject; a free will; or any free, but free from being hindered by opposition, I should not say he were in an error, but that his words were without meaning, that is to say, absurd". He distinguished seven types of absurdity. Below is the summary of Martinich, based on what he describes as Hobbes' "mature account" found in "De Corpore" 5., which all use examples that could be found in Aristotelian or scholastic philosophy, and all reflect "Hobbes' commitment to the new science of Galileo and Harvey". This is known as "Hobbes' Table of Absurdity".
"Combining the name of a body with the name of an accident." For example, "existence is a being" or, "a being is existence". These absurdities are typical of scholastic philosophy according to Hobbes.
"Combining the name of a body with the name of a phantasm." For example, "a ghost is a body".
"Combining the name of a body with the name of a name." For example, "a universal is a thing".
"Combining the name of an accident with the name of a phantasm." For example, "colour appears to a perceiver".
"Combining the name of an accident with the name of a name." For example, "a definition is the essence of a thing".
"Combining the name of a phantasm with the name of a name." For example, "the idea of a man is a universal".
"Combining the name of a thing with the name of a speech act." For example, "some entities are beings per se".

According to Martinich, Gilbert Ryle discussed the types of problem Hobbes refers to as absurdities under the term "category error".

Although common usage now considers "absurdity" to be synonymous with "ridiculousness", Hobbes discussed the two concepts as different, in that absurdity is viewed as having to do with invalid reasoning, while ridiculousness has to do with laughter, superiority, and deformity.

Theater of the Absurd 

The Theater of the Absurd was a surrealist movement demonstrating motifs of absurdism.

Theology 

Absurdity is cited as a basis for some theological reasoning about the formation of belief and faith, such as in fideism, an epistemological theory that reason and faith may be hostile to each other. The statement "Credo quia absurdum" ("I believe because it is absurd") is attributed to Tertullian from De Carne Christi, as translated by philosopher Voltaire.  According to the New Advent Church, what Tertullian said in DCC 5 was "[...] the Son of God died; it is by all means to be believed, because it is absurd."

In the 15th century, the Spanish theologian Tostatus used what he thought was a reduction to absurdity arguing against a spherical earth using dogma, claiming that a spherical earth would imply the existence of antipodes. He argued that this would be impossible since it would require either that Christ has appeared twice or that the inhabitants of the antipodes would be forever damned, which he claimed was an absurdity.

Absurdity can refer to any strict religious dogma that pushes something to the point of violating common sense. For example, inflexible religious dictates are sometimes termed pharisaism, referring to unreasonable emphasis on observing exact words or rules, rather than the intent or spirit.

Andrew Willet grouped absurdities with "flat contradictions to scripture" and "heresies".

Attitudes towards absurdity

Psychology
Psychologists study how humans adapt to constant absurdities in life. In advertising, the presence or absence of an absurd image was found to moderate negative attitudes toward products and increase product recognition.

Humor 

Absurdity is used in humor to make people laugh or to make a sophisticated point. One example is Lewis Carroll's "Jabberwocky", a poem of nonsense verse, originally featured as a part of his absurdist novel Through the Looking-Glass, and What Alice Found There (1872). Carroll was a logician and parodied logic using illogic and inverting logical methods.
Argentine novelist Jorge Luis Borges used absurdities in his short stories to make points. Franz Kafka's The Metamorphosis is considered absurdist by some.

Absurdity in various disciplines

Legal 
The absurdity doctrine is a legal theory in American courts. One type of absurdity, known as the "scrivener's error", occurs when simple textual correction is needed to amend an obvious clerical error, such as a misspelled word. Another type of absurdity, called "evaluative absurdity", arises when a legal provision, despite appropriate spelling and grammar, "makes no substantive sense". An example would be a statute that mistakenly provided for a winning rather than losing party to pay the other side's reasonable attorney's fees. In order to stay within the remit of textualism and not reach further into purposivism, the doctrine is restricted by two limiting principles: "...the absurdity and the injustice of applying the provision to the case would be so monstrous, that all mankind would, without hesitation, unite in rejecting the application" and the absurdity must be correctable "...by modifying the text in relatively simple ways". This doctrine is seen as being consistent with examples of historical common sense.

Logic and computer science 
Reductio ad absurdum

Reductio ad absurdum, reducing to an absurdity, is a method of proof in polemics, logic and mathematics, whereby assuming that a proposition is true leads to absurdity; a proposition is assumed to be true and this is used to deduce a proposition known to be false, so the original proposition must have been false. It is also an argumentation style in polemics, whereby a position is demonstrated to be false, or "absurd", by assuming it and reasoning to reach something known to be believed as false or to violate common sense; it is used by Plato to argue against other philosophical positions.
An absurdity constraint is used in the logic of model transformations.

Constant in logic

The "absurdity constant", often denoted by the symbol ⊥, is used in formal logic. It represents the concept of falsum, an elementary logical proposition, denoted by a constant "false" in several programming languages.

Rule in logic

The absurdity rule is a rule in logic, as used by Patrick Suppes in Logic, methodology and philosophy of science: Proceedings.

See also 
 Doctrine of Absurdity
 Illogical
 Nonsense
 Non sequitur (literary device)
 Ridiculous
 Silliness
 Stupidity
 The Moon is made of green cheese

References

External links

Concepts in the philosophy of language
Existentialist concepts
Popular culture